Dorothy Udeme Ufot SAN is a Nigerian lawyer with specialty in Commercial law. She is the first woman from Akwa Ibom State to be elevated to the rank of a Senior Advocate of Nigeria (SAN).

Dorothy is the founding partner of Dorothy Ufot & Co. a leading Nigerian full-service law firm where she heads the international arbitration and litigation departments of the firm. Dorothy specialises in international arbitration, litigation and other forms of dispute resolution, including investment treaty arbitration, enforcement of foreign arbitral awards, investment consulting, corporate and commercial law.

Dorothy is a member of the Court of Arbitration of the Casablanca International Mediation and Arbitration Centre (CIMAC) Morocco, since 2016. Dorothy was designated to serve a six-year term on the panel of arbitrators of the International Centre for the Settlement of Investment Disputes in February 2017. She is a former global vice president of the ICC Commission on Arbitration and ADR, and currently a member of the council of the ICC Institute of World Business Law and vice-chair of the arbitration and ADR commission of ICC Nigeria as well as the treasurer of ICC Nigeria National Committee.

Dorothy is a member of the ICC International Court of Arbitration in Paris and was the Vice President of the ICC Commission on Arbitration. In 2000, she became a fellow of the Chartered Institute of Arbitrators London.

Education
Dorothy Ufot was born in Ikwa-ibom state,Nigeria. Dorothy is a graduate of the University of Calabar, Calabar, Nigeria; with a bachelor's degree in Political Science in 1983. She then obtained an LL.B degree from the University of Lagos in 1988. On completion of the law school requirements, she was called to the Nigerian Bar in 1989. In 1996, Dorothy completed her master's degree in Law (LL.M) and also obtained an Advanced Diploma in Commercial Law and Practice from the University of Lagos, Nigeria in 1998.Dorothy Ufot is married to Mr Udeme Ufot with children.

Law career
Dorothy started her legal career after she was called to the Nigerian Bar in 1989. She specialize in commercial litigation and arbitration. In 2009, Dorothy became the first female lawyer from Akwa Ibom State to wear the silk gown.

Aside her legal career, Dorothy has also served in different capacities at the Nigerian Stock Exchange, Chevron Oil PLC, and MRS Oil PLC.

Awards 
In 2020, Dorothy was awarded the African Arbitrator of the Year by the African Arbitration Association, for her contributions in Arbitration and Commercial Law. She is also recognised as a fellow of the Chartered Institute of Arbitrators (UK) (CIArb) and a chartered arbitrator.

See also 
 First women lawyers around the world

References 

Living people
Nigerian women lawyers
20th-century Nigerian lawyers
21st-century Nigerian lawyers
Senior Advocates of Nigeria
History of women in Nigeria
20th-century Nigerian women
21st-century Nigerian women
20th-century women lawyers
21st-century women lawyers
Year of birth missing (living people)